Zhang Lifeng (born 24 January 1989) is a Chinese footballer who currently plays for Hebei China Fortune in the Chinese Super League.

Club career
Zhang Lifeng started his professional football career in 2010 when he joined Nanchang Hengyuan for the 2010 Chinese Super League campaign. On 14 July 2010, he made his debut for Nanchang in the 2010 Chinese Super League against Liaoning Whowin, coming on as a substitute for Ji Jun in the 62nd minute. 
In March 2011, Zhang moved to another China League One club Guizhou Zhicheng.

In March 2012, he transferred to China League Two side Hebei Zhongji.

Career statistics 
Statistics accurate as of match played 4 November 2017.

References

1989 births
Living people
Chinese footballers
Footballers from Hebei
People from Cangzhou
Shanghai Shenxin F.C. players
Guizhou F.C. players
Hebei F.C. players
Chinese Super League players
China League One players
Association football midfielders